Bier Ayyad Reserve is a protected reserve of Libya.

It covers an area of 20 km2.

References

Protected areas of Libya